Marvin Levy may refer to:

 Marvin David Levy (1932–2015), American composer
 Marvin Levy (publicist) (born 1928), American publicist